"When Can I See You Again?" is a song recorded by American electronica project Owl City for the 2012 Walt Disney Animation Studios film Wreck-It Ralph. It was written and produced by Adam Young, with additional writing from Matt Thiessen and Brian Lee.

Music and lyrics 
"When Can I See You Again?" is an uptempo dance-pop and synth-pop single. It features Young's "light vocals over a bed of pounding drums and twinkly synths". Young told AOL Music, "As a huge fan of Disney animation films growing up, it was a real honor to write 'When Can I See You Again' for Wreck-It Ralph. I felt like it was really challenging to try to live up to the Disney legacy. I had a blast." Since October 1, 2014, a Cantonese-language arrangement has been used as one of the two theme songs for Hong Kong Disneyland's Paint the Night Parade, alongside "Baroque Hoedown". An expanded version of the parade premiered at Disneyland in Anaheim, California, on May 22, 2015, and features new lyrics and vocals recorded by Young.

Music video 

The music video for "When Can I See You Again?" was released on October 26, 2012, and directed by Matt Stawski. It features "fun video game themes" and clips from Wreck-It Ralph. Young told AOL Music, "The funniest thing has been actually standing in front of the arcade game with controls, putting the quarter in. It's great to be back and feel like I'm 12 years old again in the arcade."

Charts

Weekly charts

Year-end charts

Certifications

References 

Songs about parting
2012 songs
2012 singles
2010s ballads
Dance-pop songs
Disney songs
Owl City songs
Songs written for animated films
Songs written for films
Songs written by Adam Young
Songs written by Brian Lee (songwriter)
Songs written by Matt Thiessen
Synth-pop songs
Animated series theme songs
Film theme songs
Walt Disney Records singles
Wreck-It Ralph